"Suited" is a single by South African singer-songwriter Shekhinah. It was released on July 14, 2017 by SME South Africa, as the first single from her debut studio album, Rose Gold. The song was produced by Luke Goliath with assistance from DJ Maphorisa and Shekhinah.

It was certified diamond by the Recording Industry of South Africa (RiSA).

Recording and background
"Suited" was produced by Luke Goliath, a record producer from Port Elizabeth who got the opportunity to work with Shekhinah after he put together a beat and gave former Idols South Africa contestant Loyiso Gijana a listen who then who put Goliath in contact with Shekhinah. After recording the vocals for the song, Shekhinah was contacted by South African record producer and disc jockey DJ Maphorisa, who added his touch to the song. Shekhinah describes the song as lighthearted with a vibe and many emotions and felt Suited is the most relatable song on her album which is a far cry from the songs that she has dropped in the past, which were mainly about relationships that went bad.

Shekhinah speaking on the song:

Music video
The music video for the single was released on Shekhinah's Vevo account on 17 August 2017. It was directed by Nate Thomas and has garnered over 10 million views on YouTube, and it features her boyfriend.

Remixes and samples

Shekhinah released a remix of "Suited" on 13 Apr 2018 which features Nigerian singer and songwriter, Mr Eazi. The song's remix is produced by afrobeats producer, Synx. The music video for the song's remix was released on Shekhinah's Vevo account on 6 Sep 2018.

Charts

Accolades  
At annual  24th South African Music Awards, "Suited" was nominated for Record of the Year.

|-
|2018
|"Suited"
|Record of the Year 
|

Certifications

References

External links 

2017 songs
2017 singles
Shekhinah (singer) songs
Electronic songs